Ecoult was an energy storage company based out of Australia.

Company history
Ecoult was originally formed in 2007 by the Australian Commonwealth Scientific and Industrial Research Organisation (CSIRO). CSIRO invented the UltraBattery, a hybrid ultracapacitor and lead-acid battery technology, and formed a subsidiary company, Ecoult, to commercialize the technology.

In May 2010, East Penn Manufacturing acquired Ecoult from CSIRO, along with the global license to manufacture the UltraBattery (outside Japan and Thailand where Furukawa Battery holds the head license).

Ecoult was named in the Cleantech Group's 2013 Global Cleantech 100 in 2013.

In July 2020, East Penn Manufacturing announced that it was winding down its investment in Ecoult. In January 2021 the ecoult.com website announced that Ecoult has ceased operations.

References

External links
 Official Website of Ecoult

Companies based in Sydney
Electronics companies established in 2007
Energy storage
Electronics companies disestablished in 2021
2021 disestablishments in Australia
2010 mergers and acquisitions
2007 establishments in Australia